William John Larkin (–1885) was a New Zealand priest, Irish nationalist and newspaper proprietor. He was born in County Galway, Ireland.
He trained for the priesthood at St. Patrick's College, Maynooth and was ordained in 1860 for the clonfert diocese.

References

1885 deaths
New Zealand writers
19th-century New Zealand Roman Catholic priests
People from County Galway
Irish emigrants to New Zealand (before 1923)
Alumni of St Patrick's College, Maynooth
Year of birth missing